Wok of Waldstein was a Bohemian noble and a notable figure among the Hussites of Prague. In 1410 he received a congratulatory letter from John Oldcastle after a number of protests resulting from the burning of books written by Wycliffe. In 1412 he was the leader of a crowd that publicly burned papal bulls regarding intercession on the pillory of Prague, and he later protested against condemnation of Jan Hus by the Council of Constance.

Notes

References
 Lea, Henry C. (2004). A History of the Inquisition of the Middle Ages Part Two. Kessinger Publishing, LLC.  
 Waugh, W. T. (1905). Sir John Oldcastle. The English Historical Review, Vol. 20, No. 79, pp. 434-456.
Medieval Bohemian nobility
Hussite people
15th-century Bohemian people